The 2009–10 OJAHL season is the first and only season of the Ontario Junior A Hockey League (OJAHL). The 15 teams of the OJAHL competed in 56 regular season games, the top eight teams in the league competed in the playoffs for the league championship.

The OJAHL's playoff champion played against the Central Canadian Hockey League's champion for the Buckland Cup.  The champion of that series played for the Dudley Hewitt Cup against the Northern Ontario Junior Hockey League and Superior International Junior Hockey League champions for the right to attend the 2010 Royal Bank Cup.

Changes 
OJHL is dissolved. Teams not in Central Division form Ontario Conference.
Ontario Conference is renamed Ontario Junior A Hockey League.
Port Hope Predators of the former OJHL are now Trenton Golden Hawks.

Current Standings 
Note: GP = Games played; W = Wins; L = Losses; OTL = Overtime losses; SL = Shootout losses; GF = Goals for; GA = Goals against; PTS = Points; x = clinched playoff berth; y = clinched division title; z = clinched conference title

Please note: Top eight teams make the playoffs (blue tint), (x-) denotes playoff berth, (y-) denotes elimination.

Teams listed on the official league website.

Standings listed by Pointstreak on official league website.

2009-10 OJAHL Playoffs

Buckland Cup
The Buckland Cup is the Junior "A" Championship of the Ontario Hockey Association.  The winner of the Buckland Cup moves on to the 2010 Dudley Hewitt Cup.

Oakville Blades defeated Newmarket Hurricanes (CCHL) 4-games-to-2
Game 1: 04/03/2010 - Newmarket 3 @ Oakville 4
Game 2: 04/05/2010 - Oakville 1 @ Newmarket 4
Game 3: 04/07/2010 - Newmarket 3 @ Oakville 1
Game 4: 04/08/2010 - Oakville 3 @ Newmarket 2
Game 5: 04/10/2010 - Newmarket 3 @ Oakville 4 OT
Game 6: 04/12/2010 - Oakville 6 @ Newmarket 1

Dudley Hewitt Cup Championship
Hosted by the Soo Thunderbirds in Sault Ste. Marie, Ontario.  The Oakville Blades finished in first place.

Round Robin
Oakville Blades 6 - Abitibi Eskimos (NOJHL) 0
Oakville Blades 3 - Soo Thunderbirds (NOJHL) 1
Oakville Blades 2 - Fort William North Stars (SIJHL) 1 in overtime
Final
Oakville Blades 2 - Fort William North Stars (SIJHL) 1

2010 Royal Bank Cup Championship
Hosted by the Dauphin Kings in Dauphin, Manitoba.  The Oakville Blades finished in last place in the round robin.

Round Robin
La Ronge Ice Wolves (SJHL) 3 - Oakville Blades 2 OT
Brockville Braves (CJHL) 11 - Oakville Blades 2
Vernon Vipers (BCHL) 5 - Oakville Blades 5
Dauphin Kings (MJHL) 5 - Oakville Blades 4

Scoring leaders 
Note: GP = Games played; G = Goals; A = Assists; Pts = Points; PIM = Penalty minutes

Leading goaltenders 
Note: GP = Games played; Mins = Minutes played; W = Wins; L = Losses: OTL = Overtime losses; SL = Shootout losses; GA = Goals Allowed; SO = Shutouts; GAA = Goals against average

Award winners
Top Scorer - Matt Smyth (Couchiching Terriers)
Best Defenceman - Kevin Christmas (Kingston Voyageurs)
Most Gentlemanly Player - Lucas Van Natter (Aurora Tigers)
Most Improved Player - Spencer Finner (Trenton Golden Hawks)
Most Valuable Player - Matt Smyth (Couchiching Terriers)
Rookie of the Year - Zach Hall (Couchiching Terriers)
Coach of the Year - Evan Robinson (Kingston Frontenacs)
Best Goaltender - Kevin Kapalka (Vaughan Vipers)

See also 
 2010 Royal Bank Cup
 Dudley Hewitt Cup
 List of Ontario Hockey Association Junior A seasons
 Central Canadian Hockey League
 Northern Ontario Junior Hockey League
 Superior International Junior Hockey League
 Greater Ontario Junior Hockey League
 2009 in ice hockey
 2010 in ice hockey

References

External links 
 Official stat site of the Ontario Junior A Hockey League
 Official website of the Canadian Junior Hockey League

Ontario Junior Hockey League seasons
Ojahl